National symbols of Germany
National anthems
National mottos
Einigkeit und Recht und Freiheit (unity and justice and freedom) may refer to:

 The unofficial national motto of Germany (and formerly West Germany prior to German reunification)
 The first words of the third verse of the Deutschlandlied, Germany's national anthem